Amar Brahmia (born 2 September 1954) is a retired Algerian middle-distance runner who specialized in the 1500 metres, who is now the national long distance track coach of Algeria. He is brother to Nacer and Baki Brahmia, both of which also competed on the international stage.

At the 1978 All-Africa Games he won a bronze medal in the 1500 metres and a silver medal in the 800 metres. He later won the bronze medal at the 1981 Summer Universiade. He became Algerian champion in 1976 and 1978, and won a silver medal at the AAA Championships in 1978. He also competed at the 1983 World Championships without reaching the final.

His personal best time in the 1500 metres was 3.36.5 minutes, achieved in September 1981 in Rieti. He also had 2.17.5 minutes in the 1000 metres, achieved in August 1978 in Nice; and 3.57.20 minutes in the mile run, achieved in September 1981 in Rieti;

References

1954 births
Living people
Algerian male middle-distance runners
African Games silver medalists for Algeria
African Games medalists in athletics (track and field)
Universiade medalists in athletics (track and field)
African Games bronze medalists for Algeria
Athletes (track and field) at the 1978 All-Africa Games
Universiade bronze medalists for Algeria
Medalists at the 1981 Summer Universiade
21st-century Algerian people
20th-century Algerian people